Elise Hughes (born 15 April 2001) is a Welsh footballer who plays as a forward for Crystal Palace in the FA Women's Championship and the Welsh national team.

Early and personal life
Hughes was born in Hawarden, Flintshire.

Her grandfather David and father Peter were both footballers. The family supports Everton.

Club career
Hughes came through Everton's Regional Talent Centre. In February 2018, Hughes made her first team debut for Everton in a 1–0 loss against Arsenal at 16 years old. Hughes scored her first professional goal in a derby win against Liverpool during the group stage of the FA WSL Cup.

On 4 January 2020, Hughes joined Bristol City on loan for the rest of the season. However, Hughes returned to Everton on 30 January to rehabilitate after suffering an ACL injury.

International career
Hughes has made appearances for the Wales women's national football team at the under-16 and under-17 levels. She has been called up several times to the senior team, and made her senior debut 5 March 2018 in the Cyprus Cup against Switzerland.

References

Living people
2001 births
People from Hawarden
Sportspeople from Flintshire
Women's Super League players
Everton F.C. (women) players
Bristol City W.F.C. players
Welsh women's footballers
Women's association football forwards
Charlton Athletic W.F.C. players
Women's Championship (England) players